Beauty Point may refer to:

Beauty Point, Tasmania, Australia
Beauty Point, New South Wales, Australia